Ondřej Martinka (born May 3, 1987) is a Czech professional ice hockey defenceman. He played with HC Litvínov in the Czech Extraliga during the 2010–11 Czech Extraliga season.

References

External links

1987 births
Czech ice hockey defencemen
HC Litvínov players
Living people
Flint Generals (CoHL) players
Sportspeople from Most (city)
Czech expatriate ice hockey players in the United States
Czech expatriate sportspeople in France
Expatriate ice hockey players in France
HC Dukla Jihlava players
IHC Písek players
HC Stadion Litoměřice players
HC Most players
Czech expatriate ice hockey players in Russia
Titan Klin players
Diables Rouges de Briançon players
Scorpions de Mulhouse players